Gardner Bender is a manufacturer of professional electricians' tools and supplies. The company has a long history, starting as the brainchild of Jim Gardner, a master mechanic in a Milwaukee aluminum can plant who spent his free time as an inventor. In 1959, after watching the electricians at the plant struggle with an inferior device, Gardner invented an aluminum pipe bender so promising that he decided to manufacture it himself. Today, Gardner Bender manufactures electrical tools, voltage testers, wire management products and other professional equipment.

External links 
Official Website

Electrical tool manufacturers
Tool manufacturing companies of the United States
Electrical wiring and construction supplies manufacturers
Building materials companies of the United States
Companies based in Milwaukee